Tukucha Nala is a village development committee in Kabhrepalanchok District in the Bagmati Zone of central Nepal. At the time of the 1991 Nepal census it had a population of 4,094 in 658 individual households.

References

External links
UN map of the municipalities of Kavrepalanchok District

In tukucha we have got some  temples like Manakamana,Radha krishna,Gorkhakali,etc.

Populated places in Kavrepalanchok District